Candidate of Law (Latin: candidatus/candidata juris/iuris) is both a graduate law degree awarded to law students in the Nordic region as well as an academic status designation for advanced Law School students in German-speaking countries. 

Nordics except Denmark have changed their law degrees from the candidate to masters due Bologna Process. The Candidate law degree was formerly also existent in Estonia, Finland, Iceland, Norway and Sweden.

The exam can only be taken at a university with a diploma privilege granted by the government. The competition for a study right in law at university is very fierce in the Nordic region. There are usually more than ten applicants to each place at law faculties. The admission system, however, varies in every country.

Countries

Denmark
Juridisk kandidateksamen (cand. jur.) is obtained after five years of law studies (180 + 120 ECTS). Undergraduate degree is Bachelor i jura (bac. jur.) which usually take three years to complete (180 ECTS).

Estonia 
Before the Soviet occupation, a post-graduate law degree was cand.jur. in Estonia. For example, President Konstantin Päts had the cand. jur. degree from the University of Tartu. The degree derives from history, Estonia has been for centuries under the influence of Nordic countries, e.g. by being a part of the Danish Kingdom. The current post-graduate law degree is Õigusteaduse magister.

Finland
Before 2005 Finland had Oikeustieteen kandidaatti, abbreviated OTK (Jur. kand.) degree. It was replaced by Oikeustieteen maisteri, abbreviated OTM (JM) which is obtained after five years of law studies (180 + 120 ECTS). Previously graduated OTK diploma holders were eligible to continue using their previous title.

Both before and after the Bologna process, the academic degree is split into two different diplomas. Previously, the lower degree was Varanotaari, abbreviated VN, and current lower degree Oikeusnotaari, abbreviated ON (RN) is awarded after completing three years of study (180 ECTS).

Germany, Austria and Switzerland 

In Germany, Austria and Switzerland, the term "cand. iur." is a designation used in the academic environment by advanced law students. However, it is not an academic degree. Rather, the designation is used in an internal university context or in the context of publications, for example contributions to journals or anthologies. The designation is usually obtained after successful completion of the intermediate examination (after 4 to 6 semesters) and roughly corresponds to the qualification level of a Bachelor of Laws. Before passing the intermediate examination, law students shall use the designation "stud. iur." (studiosus iuris).

In Germany, law school is completed with passing of the First Law Examination after 4-6 years of study. Subsequently, graduates can be addressed as "Ref. iur." (Rechtsreferendar) or "Jurist Univ."  Some law faculties also award the academic degrees "Diplom-Jurist", "Diplom-Jurist (Univ.)" or "Mag. iur.".

In Austria, the degree programme ends with a diploma examination, and the academic degree "Mag. iur." is awarded.

In Switzerland, the designation "cand. iur. is no longer common, since the Bologna reform has changed the degree programme to the Bachelor's and Master's system, so that the academic degrees "BLaw" (Bachelor of Law) are awarded after three years and "MLaw" (Master of Law) after further two years of study. The academic degree "lic. iur." was abolished in the course of the Bologna reform. In the undergraduate BLaw programme, students generally use the designation "stud. iur.".

Iceland 
Formerly Iceland had Embættispróf í lögfræði (cand. jur.) degree but it have been replaced by ML í lögfræði (mag. jur.) title.

Norway
Previously Norway had cand. jur. title which was replaced in 2003 with the Master i Rettsvitenskap degree. Last cand. jur. degree's were awarded in spring 2007. The Master i Rettsvitenskap is obtained after five years of law studies (300 ECTS).

Sweden
Before 2010 Sweden had Jurist kandidatexamen (jur. kand.) degree. The former degree was replaced by Juristexamen is completed after four and a half years of studying at the normal pace (270 ECTS). Previously graduated jur. kand. diploma holders were are eligible to continue using their title.

See also
Candidate (degree)

References

External links
 The Faculty of Law at the University of Copenhagen, Denmark
 The Faculty of Law at the University of Oslo, Norway
 The Faculty of Law at the University of Helsinki, Finland
 The Department of Law at Åbo Akademi, Finland
 The Faculty of Law at the University of Stockholm, Sweden
 The Faculty of Law at the University of Lund, Sweden
 The Faculty of Law at the University of Uppsala, Sweden

Sources 

Law degrees
Scandinavian titles
Law of Sweden
Law of Denmark
Law of Norway
Law of Finland